Samuel M. Blatchford (March 9, 1820 – July 7, 1893) was an American attorney and judge. He was most notable for his service as an Associate Justice of the Supreme Court of the United States from April 3, 1882 until his death in 1893.

Early life

Blatchford was born in Auburn, New York on March 9, 1820.  He was the eldest of five children born to Julia Ann (née Mumford) Blatchford and Richard Milford Blatchford (1798–1875), a well known attorney and friend of Daniel Webster who served as a New York State Assemblyman in 1855, U.S. Minister to the Papal States, and New York City Park Commissioner in 1872.  After his mother's death in 1857, his father remarried to Angelica Hamilton, the daughter of James Alexander Hamilton and granddaughter of Alexander Hamilton, the first Treasury Secretary.  Angelica died in 1868, and Blatchford married for the third time, to Katherine Hone.

His grandfather, also named Samuel Blatchford, was born in England and was the first president of Rensselaer Polytechnic Institute.  The younger Samuel Blatchford was educated at Columbia College, where he joined the Philolexian Society and graduated when he was 17 years old.  In 1840, he served as the private secretary to Governor William H. Seward.

Early career
Blatchford studied law under Seward and then entered into the private practice of law with his father and uncle. In 1854, he moved to New York City and started a law firm, Blatchford, Seward & Griswold, now known as Cravath, Swaine & Moore. He became well known for preparing summaries of United States circuit court cases, serving for a time as reporter of decisions for the Circuit Court in New York, and developed a lucrative practice in admiralty law.

On May 3, 1867, Blatchford received a recess appointment from President Andrew Johnson to a seat on the United States District Court for the Southern District of New York vacated by Samuel Betts.  Formally nominated on July 13, 1867, Blatchford was confirmed by the United States Senate three days later, receiving his commission the same day.

On February 15, 1878, President Rutherford B. Hayes promoted Blatchford to serve as Circuit Judge of the Second U.S. Judicial Circuit to fill the vacancy caused by the death of Alexander Smith Johnson. Blatchford was confirmed by the Senate, and received his commission, on March 4, 1878.

Supreme Court of the United States

On March 13, 1882, Blatchford was  nominated as an associate justice of the United States Supreme Court, by President Chester A. Arthur, to a seat vacated by Ward Hunt, after two other candidates, Senator George F. Edmunds and former Senator Roscoe Conkling, declined. He was confirmed by the United States Senate on March 22, 1882, and was sworn into office on April 3, 1882. Blatchford thus became the first person to serve at all three levels of the federal judiciary—as a District Judge, a Circuit Judge, and a Supreme Court Justice.  When he was nominated for the Supreme Court, it was estimated that his personal wealth exceeded $3 million (over $77 million in 2018), mostly held in real estate.

Blatchford was an expert in admiralty law and patent law, and authored Blatchford and Howland's Admiralty Cases, which was considered the most complete work of its kind. During his eleven-year tenure on the High Court, he wrote 430 opinions and two dissents. His most noteworthy opinions, Chicago, Milwaukee & St. Paul Railway Co. v. Minnesota, and Budd v. People of New York, were roundly criticized for their apparently contradictory conclusions about due process under the Fourteenth Amendment of the U.S. Constitution.

Personal life

In 1844, Blatchford was married to Caroline Frances Appleton (1817–1881) in Boston.  Caroline was the daughter of Eben Appleton and Sarah (née Patterson) Appleton. Together, they had one son:
 Samuel Appleton Blatchford (1845–1905), also a lawyer who married Wilhelmina Bogart Conger (1848–1944), daughter of Hon. Abraham B. Conger, the namesake of Congers, New York.

On what he thought was inside information, Blatchford sold all his shares of stock on the eve of the Battle of Fort Sumter and the decline in stock prices that took place at the onset of the American Civil War, thus preserving his personal fortune.

Blatchford served as a trustee of Columbia College.

In June 1893, he was stricken with paralysis at his home in Newport, Rhode Island on Greenough Place.  Blatchford died at his home in Newport at age 73 on July 7, 1893.  After a funeral service at the All Saints' Chapel in Newport conducted by Bishop Henry C. Potter (his brother-in-law Edward Tuckerman Potter's brother), his body was transported by train to New York City where he was buried at Greenwood Cemetery in Brooklyn.

In his will, which was drawn on June 15, 1876, he left $100,000 to Rachel Bliss Beckwith and $20,000 to Cordelia F. Green.  To his widow, he left the furniture and artwork in his Newport home and the income from half of his estate.  His son received the other half of the income and split the realty with his mother.  Upon his wife's death, one-third of her share of the realty went to Rachel Beckwith, a third to Julia Maria Potter, and the remaining third to his unmarried sister, Sophia Ethelinda Blatchford.

See also
List of justices of the Supreme Court of the United States

References

Further reading

External links
 
 

|-

|-

1820 births
1893 deaths
19th-century American judges
19th-century American politicians
American legal writers
Burials at Green-Wood Cemetery
Columbia College (New York) alumni
Judges of the United States Court of Appeals for the Second Circuit
Judges of the United States District Court for the Southern District of New York
New York (state) lawyers
New York (state) Republicans
Politicians from Auburn, New York
United States federal judges appointed by Andrew Johnson
United States federal judges appointed by Chester A. Arthur
United States federal judges appointed by Rutherford B. Hayes
Justices of the Supreme Court of the United States
United States federal judges admitted to the practice of law by reading law
Cravath, Swaine & Moore people